Francis J. "Bing" West Jr. (born May 2, 1940) is an American author, Marine combat veteran and former Assistant Secretary of Defense for International Security Affairs during the Reagan Administration.

West writes about the military, warfighting, and counterinsurgency. In the Vietnam War, he fought in major operations and conducted over a hundred combat patrols in 1966–1968. For the United States Marine Corps, he wrote the training manual Small Unit Action in Vietnam, describing how to fight in close combat. As an analyst at the RAND Corporation, he wrote a half dozen detailed monographs about fighting against an insurgency. Later, as Assistant Secretary of Defense, he dealt with the insurgencies in El Salvador. From 2003 through 2008, he made 16 extended trips to Iraq, going on patrols and writing three books and numerous articles about the war. From 2007 through 2011, he made numerous trips to embed in Afghanistan.

Life and career
West is from the Massachusetts communities of Dorchester, Boston, Milton and Scituate. He is a graduate of Georgetown University (BA) and Princeton University (MA), where he was a Woodrow Wilson Fellow.

West was an infantry officer in the Marine Corps during the Vietnam War. He led the mortar platoon of 2nd Battalion, 9th Marines. Later, he served with a Combined Action Platoon that fought for 485 days in a remote village. He was also a member of the Marine Force Reconnaissance team that initiated "Operation Stingray": small unit attacks behind enemy lines. He authored a study at the RAND Corporation entitled "The Strike Teams: Tactical Performance and Strategic Potential". This paper was the featured event at the 1970 Department of Defense Counterinsurgency Research and Development Symposium. The RAND Military Systems Simulations Group implemented a classified model of West's concept. This doctrinal innovation was directly opposed by Military Assistance Command Vietnam (MACV), which favored the Army's concept of Air-Mobility "Fire and Thunder Operations". By way of rebuttal, West wrote The Village, chronicling the daily lives of 15 Marines who protected Vietnamese villagers by living among them in their hamlets. The book became a classic of practical counterinsurgency and has been on the Marine Corps Commandant's Required Reading List for five decades.

West served as Assistant Secretary of Defense for International Security Affairs in the Ronald Reagan administration, and chaired the United States Security Commissions with El Salvador, Morocco, Tunisia, Egypt, Israel, Jordan, Pakistan, South Korea, and Japan.

Among other awards, West is the recipient of the Department of Defense Distinguished Public Service Medal, the Department of the Navy Distinguished Civilian Service Medal, and Tunisia's Medaille de Liberté. A member of the Council on Foreign Relations and the Infantry Order of St. Crispin, he appears frequently on C-SPAN and The News Hour on PBS.

Writing
West is the author of a dozen books. His latest is The Last Platoon: A Novel of the Afghanistan War, Bombardier Press, 2020
. His 2019 collaboration with Marine General Jim Mattis, entitled Call Sign Chaos: Learning to Lead, was the #1 New York Times Bestseller. A prior book, written with retired Marine Major General Ray L. Smith, The March Up, was awarded the Marine Corps Heritage Foundation's General Wallace M. Greene, Jr. Award for non-fiction, as well as the William E. Colby Award for military history. The Veterans of Foreign Wars presented West with their National Media Award in 2005, after he wrote the book No True Glory: A Frontline Account of the Battle for Fallujah. His book The Strongest Tribe is a history of the Iraq War that was a New York Times Best Seller and was ranked by Foreign Affairs magazine as #7 among the top foreign policy books of 2009. Into the Fire ranked #8 on the New York Times Best Seller List.

In The Strongest Tribe and in a subsequent article in Military Review about counterinsurgency lessons, West argued that the current doctrine of nation-building and winning hearts and minds by economic development was based on Western liberal theory rather than the realities of battle. West has grave reservations about extolling the effects of "non-kinetic COIN" (counterinsurgency). He believes that the warriors, not the people, defeat warriors, and that America's mistake in both Iraq and Afghanistan was to concede all authority to appoint and to remove for cause military and police officers. He believes American policymakers tried to do too much with too little in too short a time. He believes the White House has devolved into a kingdom of courtiers, disconnected from a populace that must be united to emerge victorious from wars, large or small.

His articles have appeared in The Wall Street Journal, The New York Times, The Atlantic, National Review, and The Washington Post. He is the recipient of the Department of Defense Distinguished Public Service Medal (twice), the Marine Corps Heritage Award (thrice), the Goodpaster Prize for Military Scholarship, the Father Clyde E. Leonard Award, the Free Press Award, the Marine Corps Correspondents' Distinguished Performance Award, the Veterans of Foreign Wars' National Media Award and the Marine Corps Russell Award for Leadership.

Personal life
West lives with his wife, Elizabeth, in Newport, Rhode Island and Hilton Head, SC. He has two daughters and two sons (one of whom is Owen West). He also has 8 grandchildren.

Books
 Bing West, The Last Platoon. 
 Bing West & Jim Mattis, Call Sign Chaos: Learning to Lead.
Small Unit Action in Vietnam, Summer 1966. .
The Village. .
Naval Forces and National Security. .
The Pepperdogs: a Novel. .
The March Up: Taking Baghdad with the US Marines. .
No True Glory: a Front-line Account of the Battle of Fallujah. .
The Strongest Tribe: War, Politics, and the Endgame in Iraq (Random House, 2008) 
The Wrong War: Grit, Strategy, and the Way Out of Afghanistan .
One Million Steps: A Marine Platoon at War. 
Into the Fire:a Firsthand Account of the Most Extraordinary Battle in the Afghan War

References
Notes

External links
Official Website
Bing West index at The Atlantic
Tripping Light Press
Review of West's The Strongest Tribe: War, Politics, and the Endgame in Iraq from The New York Review of Books
 Interview on No True Glory  at the Pritzker Military Museum & Library on November 10, 2005
Interview on The Wrong War at the Pritzker Military Museum & Library on March 9, 2011
 Conversation with Dakota Meyer on Into the Fire at the Pritzker Military Museum & Library on October 3, 2012

1940 births
Living people
Writers from Boston
United States Marine Corps officers
United States Marine Corps personnel of the Vietnam War
American military writers
Georgetown University alumni
Princeton University alumni
Military personnel from Massachusetts
United States Assistant Secretaries of Defense
Reagan administration personnel